Strangeways River is a tributary of the Roper River east of Elsey, Northern Territory.

Rivers of the Northern Territory
Landforms of the Northern Territory